Salia Sahi in Bhubaneswar is the largest slum of Odisha, India, spanning over 256 acres and containing a population of over 100,000.

References

Neighbourhoods in Bhubaneswar
Slums in India